Urupadi National Forest is a national forest (Brazil) in the state of Amazonas, Brazil.

Location

Urupadi National Forest is in the Maués municipality of Amazonas.
The forest is just north of the stretch of the BR-230 Trans-Amazonian Highway between Sucunduri (Apuí) and Jacareacanga.
It adjoins the Acari National Park to the west and the Alto Maués Ecological Station to the north.
To the east it adjoins the Amaná National Forest in the state of Pará.

It is in the Amazon biome.
The region has suffered relatively low deforestation, but there is growing pressure from loggers, ranchers and soybean farmers.
The soils are acid and infertile, unsuitable for agriculture and pasture.

History

Urupadi National Forest was created by decree on 11 May 2016.
It is administered by the Chico Mendes Institute for Biodiversity Conservation (ICMBio).

The forest is one of five conservation units created in the last week before the provisional removal of president Dilma Rousseff, totalling , all in the south of Amazonas state.

Her administration had also reduced the area of seven protected areas in the Amazon to allow for construction of dams on the Tapajós.

Notes

Sources

2016 establishments in Brazil
National forests of Brazil
Protected areas of Amazonas (Brazilian state)